Cape Moyes is an ice-covered headland fronting on the Shackleton Ice Shelf,  west of Cape Dovers. It was discovered by the Australasian Antarctic Expedition (AAE) under Mawson, 1911–14, and named by him for Morton H. Moyes, meteorologist with the AAE Western Base party.

References 

Headlands of Queen Mary Land